Veintisiete de Abril is a district of the Santa Cruz canton, in the Guanacaste province of Costa Rica.

Geography 
Veintisiete de Abril has an area of  km² and an elevation of  metres.

Villages
Administrative center of the district is the village of Veintisiete de Abril.

Other villages in the district are Aguacate, Avellana, Barrosa, Brisas, Bruno, Cacaovano, Camones, Cañas Gordas, Ceiba Mocha, Cerro Brujo, Delicias, Espavelar, Florida, Gorgolona, Guachipelín, Guapote, Hatillo, Icacal, Isla Verde, Playa Junquillal, Junta de Río Verde, Mesas, Montaña, Monteverde, Níspero, Paraíso, Pargos, Pasa Hondo, Pilas, Playa Negra, Pochotes, Ranchos, Retallano (partly), Río Seco, Río Tabaco, San Francisco, San Jerónimo, Soncoyo, Tieso, Trapiche, Venado and Vergel.

Demographics 

For the 2011 census, Veintisiete de Abril had a population of  inhabitants.

Transportation

Road transportation 
The district is covered by the following road routes:
 National Route 152
 National Route 160
 National Route 904
 National Route 909
 National Route 928

References 

Districts of Guanacaste Province
Populated places in Guanacaste Province